Edward R. Brunner (born 1953) is an American lawyer and retired judge.  He was a judge of the Wisconsin Court of Appeals from 2007 through 2011 in the Wausau-based District III.  Previously, he was a Wisconsin Circuit Court Judge for 19 years, and was Chief Judge of the 10th District of Wisconsin Circuit Courts from 1999 through 2005.

Biography
A resident of Rice Lake, Wisconsin, Brunner is a graduate of Marquette University and the University of Akron School of Law. Additionally, he trained as an emergency medical technician at Wisconsin Indianhead Technical College. He is married with two children.

Early career
Brunner began his legal career working for the Juvenile Delinquency Prevention Services, under the 
Office of Justice Programs in the United States Department of Justice—Brunner was Assistant Regional Administrator in the Akron, Ohio, office.  From 1974 until 1977, he was executive director of Youth Services in Lorain, Ohio.  In 1977, he moved to Wisconsin and was hired as corporation counsel for the Department of Human Services in Barron County, Wisconsin, where he served until 1979.  He worked as an attorney in the private sector for the next decade, and served as City attorney for Rice Lake.

Judicial career

Brunner was elected Wisconsin Circuit Court Judge for Barron County's newly created Branch 2 seat in 1988.  He was re-elected in 1994, 2000, and 2006.  In 1999 he was designated by the Wisconsin Supreme Court as Chief Judge of the 10th Judicial Administrative District and remained in that role until August 2005.

As Judge, Brunner was responsible for introducing restorative justice projects to Barron County in 1998, and was an advocate for statewide implementation.

He was a candidate for Wisconsin Supreme Court in 2003, but was defeated in the general election by future Chief Justice Patience D. Roggensack.  Brunner was endorsed by former Governor Tony Earl and 178 Wisconsin circuit court judges, or 74% of the courts' judges.  In 2007, he was elected without opposition to the Wisconsin Court of Appeals.  He didn't serve his whole term, resigning in September 2011.

Awards and works

In 2006, he was awarded the 2005 Lifetime Jurist Achievement Award from the State Bar of Wisconsin.  The same year, he received the William H. Rehnquist Award for Judicial Excellence from the Supreme Court of the United States, one of the most prestigious judicial awards in the country.

Electoral history

Wisconsin Circuit Court (1988, 1994, 2000)

| colspan="6" style="text-align:center;background-color: #e9e9e9;"| Primary Election, February 16, 1988

| colspan="6" style="text-align:center;background-color: #e9e9e9;"| General Election, April 5, 1988

| colspan="6" style="text-align:center;background-color: #e9e9e9;"| General Election, April 5, 1994

| colspan="6" style="text-align:center;background-color: #e9e9e9;"| General Election, April 4, 2000

Wisconsin Supreme Court (2003)

| colspan="6" style="text-align:center;background-color: #e9e9e9;"| Primary Election, February 18, 2003

| colspan="6" style="text-align:center;background-color: #e9e9e9;"| General Election, April 1, 2003

Wisconsin Circuit Court (2006)

| colspan="6" style="text-align:center;background-color: #e9e9e9;"| General Election, April 4, 2006

Wisconsin Appeals Court (2007)

| colspan="6" style="text-align:center;background-color: #e9e9e9;"| General Election, April 3, 2007

References

People from Rice Lake, Wisconsin
Wisconsin Court of Appeals judges
Wisconsin lawyers
Marquette University alumni
University of Akron alumni
Living people
1953 births